Les Ormes is a commune in the Vienne department in the Nouvelle-Aquitaine region in western France.

Château des Ormes, once the seat of Marc-Pierre de Voyer de Paulmy d'Argenson (1696–1764), Minister of War for Louis XV, is located in the commune.

Demographics

See also
Communes of the Vienne department

References

External links
Château des Ormes — French Wikipédia

Communes of Vienne